Batawa Ski Hill is a ski area in the municipality of Quinte West in eastern Ontario, Canada, that was established in  by employees of Bata Shoes just outside the community of Batawa.  The area offers lighted night skiing, a terrain park, and snowshoeing. The ski hill operates one quad Chairlift and one T-Bar.

See also
List of ski areas and resorts in Canada

References

External links

1955 establishments in Ontario
Ski areas and resorts in Ontario
Tourist attractions in Hastings County